Independence is an unincorporated community in Jackson County, West Virginia, United States. It is located on County Route 33/12 between the communities of Crow Summit and New Era.

References

Unincorporated communities in Jackson County, West Virginia
Unincorporated communities in West Virginia